Diana Y. Chen (born June 17, 1984 in Salt Lake City, Utah, United States) is an American figure skater who competed internationally for Taiwan. She is the 2003 Taiwanese national champion. Her highest placement at an ISU Championship was 33rd at the 2001 World Junior Figure Skating Championships.

Results

References
 

1984 births
Living people
American people of Chinese descent
American sportspeople of Taiwanese descent
Figure skaters from Salt Lake City